Gary Edward Smith (born February 4, 1944) is a Canadian former professional ice hockey goaltender. Gary is a son of Des Smith and brother of Brian Smith, both former National Hockey League (NHL) players. Smith played for numerous clubs, including the Chicago Black Hawks, Oakland Seals, Toronto Maple Leafs, Vancouver Canucks, Washington Capitals and  Winnipeg Jets. He was the co-winner of the Vezina Trophy in the 1971–72 NHL season.

Playing career
Smith played his junior hockey with the Toronto St. Michael's Majors, Toronto Neil McNeil Maroons and the Toronto Marlboros. He won a Memorial Cup with the Toronto Marlboros in 1964. In 1965, Gary Smith entered the NHL with the Toronto Maple Leafs, and was one of five goalies who played for the Maple Leafs during the 1966–67 regular season, their most recent Stanley Cup season.

He eventually earned the nickname "Suitcase" Smith because of the large number of teams he played for. After playing with the dismal California Golden Seals from 1967–68 to 1970–71, with whom he set records in 1970–71 for both the most games played in a single season and most losses in a single season, his first success was sharing the 1971–72 Vezina Trophy with Tony Esposito while with the Chicago Black Hawks. One year later, Smith and Esposito helped lead the Black Hawks to the Stanley Cup final, which they lost to the Montreal Canadiens in six games.

In 1974–75, he had a fine season with the Vancouver Canucks, with 72 games played and six shutouts.  Smith finished fifth place in balloting for the 1975 Hart Memorial Trophy, awarded to the player judged most valuable to his team. The ultimate winner, Bobby Clarke, said in his acceptance speech that Smith was more deserving of the award.

Smith later played in the World Hockey Association (WHA), and was a teammate of Wayne Gretzky while playing for the Indianapolis Racers. He was part of the Winnipeg Jets' 1979 Avco World Trophy championship, won against the Edmonton Oilers, led by Wayne Gretzky. Coincidentally, when Gretzky attended his first NHL game at Maple Leaf Gardens, Smith played for the California Golden Seals against the Maple Leafs.

Smith's last coach in Winnipeg was Tom McVie, who coached Smith the previous season while both were with the Washington Capitals.

Smith gave up the last goal in WHA history to Dave Semenko.

Miscellaneous
Smith was noted for his between periods ritual of removing his entire uniform and goaltending gear and putting it all back on again. His explanation was the need to tighten his skate boots which stretched in size, forcing him to wear as many as 13 pairs of socks at times. He performed his undressing routine throughout his career as an active player, even after resolving his skate boot issues.

Smith has had many other claims to fame, according to an interview in The Province in 1997. In his first NHL game, Smith left his crease in an attempt to score a goal. He got to the Canadiens' blueline but then JC Tremblay came along. "He nailed me," said Smith. As a result of his tendency to skate past the blue line the NHL introduced a rule preventing the goaltender from being involved in play after crossing the center red line.

In another game Smith punted the puck in Maple Leaf Gardens, almost hitting the clock.

Another time he left the Vancouver Pacific Coliseum still wearing his goaltender uniform. "It's tough driving in your skates," he said in the same 1997 interview.

As of 1997 he was living in Vancouver and managing the racehorses he owned, including one named Broadcaster, named after his brother Brian, an Ottawa broadcaster who was murdered.
Gary currently resides in Del Mar, California and continues to manage his horses.

Awards and achievements
 Memorial Cup championship in 1964
 Calder Cup championship in 1966
 Vezina Trophy winner in 1972 (shared with Tony Esposito).
 Played in 1975 NHL All-Star Game
 Avco World Trophy championship in 1979
 Holds NHL record for most losses in a season (48 in 1971)

Career statistics

Regular season and playoffs

Citations

References

External links

1944 births
Living people
California Golden Seals players
Canadian ice hockey goaltenders
Chicago Blackhawks players
Fort Worth Texans players
Hershey Bears players
Ice hockey people from Ottawa
Indianapolis Racers players
Minnesota North Stars players
National Hockey League All-Stars
Oakland Seals players
Rochester Americans players
Toronto Maple Leafs players
Toronto Marlboros players
Toronto St. Michael's Majors players
Tulsa Oilers (1964–1984) players
Vancouver Canucks players
Vezina Trophy winners
Victoria Maple Leafs players
Washington Capitals players
Winnipeg Jets (1979–1996) players
Winnipeg Jets (WHA) players
Canadian expatriate ice hockey players in the United States